Capoliveri is a comune (municipality) on the island of Elba in Italy. The name appeared for the first time in a document of The republic of Genoa.

References

External links
 Official website
 www.capoliverionline.it/
Tourism in Capoliveri

Cities and towns in Tuscany
Elba